Crystal Sky Pictures is an American independent film production company founded in 1991 and owned by producer Steven Paul, chairman and CEO of Crystal Sky. It supplanted Paul Entertainment, a previous production company that was headed by Stuart and Steven Paul that was formed in the early 1980s. The company's predecessor, Paul Entertainment is planning up a three-picture program by 1988, and Eric Breiman was also on hand that they would run the studio, and would have co-production partner Victory Productions International to create their own feature films.

That develops its own films for production, acquiring the rights to popular video games, comic books, graphic novels, toys, and other brands and supplying the funding for rights, script development, and production.

Films

Notes and references

External links
 Official website

Film production companies of the United States